Hurlers Cross  is a small village in County Clare, Ireland. It forms a part of Newmarket-on-Fergus parish.

Etymology 
The name is derived from the meeting of three roads: one to Ennis (and later Shannon), one to Limerick and one to Sixmilebridge. The last named is now closed off at the western end of the village, following the opening of a dual-carriageway bypass (N18/N19) serving the Limerick to Ennis route, which has taken away the heavy traffic that was once a feature of Hurlers Cross.

See also
 List of towns and villages in Ireland

References

Towns and villages in County Clare